The United States Food and Drug Administration Modernization Act of 1997 (FDAMA) amended the Federal Food, Drug, and Cosmetic Act.  This act is related to the regulation of food, drugs, devices, and biological products by the FDA. These changes were made in order to recognize the changes in the way the FDA would be operating in the 21st century. The main focus of this is the acknowledgment in the advancement of technological, trade, and public health complexities.

History
Congressman Richard Burr and Senator James M. Jeffords were the chairperson sponsors of the Food and Drug Administration Regulatory Modernization Act of 1997 or Food and Drug Administration Modernization Act of 1997. The U.S. legislation was signed by Bill Clinton on 21 November 1997, and was fully enacted by 1 April 1999, putting into law reforms begun under the National Partnership for Reinventing Government. One result of the passing of the act was a reduction in the time for the approval of new pharmaceutical drugs.

Provisions
The FDA Modernization Act of 1997 was a piece of legislation that concentrated on reforming the regulation of food, medical products, and cosmetics in the United States. The following are the most significant provisions of the act:

Prescription drug user fees
The act reauthorized, for five more years, the Prescription Drug User Fee Act of 1992 (PDUFA). The purpose of this was to enable the FDA to reduce the average time required for a drug review from 30 months to 15 months.

FDA initiatives and programs
The law enacts many FDA initiatives undertaken in recent years under Vice President Al Gore's Reinventing Government program. The codified initiatives include measures to modernize the regulation of biological products by bringing them in harmony with the regulations for drugs and eliminating the need for establishment license application; eliminate the batch certification and monograph requirements for insulin and antibiotics; streamline the approval processes for drug and biological manufacturing changes; and reduce the need for environmental assessment as part of a product application.

The act also codifies FDA regulations and practice to increase patient access to experimental drugs and medical devices and to accelerate review of important new medications. In addition, the law provides for an expanded database on clinical trials, which will be accessible by patients. With the sponsor's consent, the results of such clinical trials will be included in the database. Under a separate provision, patients will receive advance notice when a manufacturer plans to discontinue a drug on which they depend for life support or sustenance, or for a treatment of a serious or debilitating disease or condition.

Information on off-label use and drug economics
The law abolishes the long-standing prohibition of broadcasting by manufacturers of information about unapproved uses of drugs and medical devices. The act allows a firm to circulate peer-reviewed journal articles about an off-label indication of its product, providing the company is also committing itself to file proof of research within a certain amount of time.

The act also allows drug companies to provide economic information about their products to formulary committees, managed care organizations, and similar large-scale buyers of health-care products. The provision is intended to provide such entities with dependable facts about the economic consequences of their procurement decisions. The law, however, does not permit the spreading of economic information that could affect prescribing choices to individual medical practitioners.

Pharmacy compounding
The act creates a special exemption to ensure continued availability of compounded drug products prepared by pharmacists to provide patients with individualized therapies not available commercially. The law, however, seeks to prevent manufacturing under the guise of compounding by establishing parameters within which the practice is appropriate and lawful.

Risk-based regulation of medical devices
The act complements and builds on the FDA's recent measures to focus its resources on medical devices that present the greatest risks to patients. For example, the law exempts from premarket notification, class I devices that are not intended for a use that is of substantial importance in preventing impairment of human health, or that do not present a potential unreasonable risk of illness or injury. The law also directs the FDA to focus its post market surveillance on higher risk devices, and allows the agency to implement a reporting system that concentrates on a representative sample of user facilities—such as hospitals and nursing homes—that experience deaths and serious illnesses or injuries linked with the use of devices.

Finally, the law expands an ongoing pilot program under which the FDA accredits outside—so-called "third party"—experts to conduct the initial review of all low-to-intermediate risk class I and II devices. The act, however, specifies that an accredited person may not review devices that are permanently implantable, life-supporting, life sustaining, or for which clinical data are required.

Food safety and labeling
The act eliminates the requirement of the FDA's premarket approval for most packaging and other substances that come in contact with food and may migrate into it. Instead, the law establishes a process whereby the manufacturer can notify the agency of its intent to use certain food contact substances and, unless the FDA objects within 120 days, the manufacturer may proceed with the marketing of the new product. Implementation of the notification process is contingent on additional appropriations to cover its cost to the agency. The act also expands procedures under which the FDA can authorize health claims and nutrient content claims without reducing the statutory standard.

Standards for medical products
While the act reduces or simplifies many regulatory obligations of manufacturers, it does not lower the standards by which medical products are introduced into the market place. In the area of drugs, the law codifies the agency's current practice of allowing in certain circumstances one clinical investigation as the basis for product approval. The act, however, does preserve the presumption that, as a general rule, two adequate and well-controlled studies are needed to prove the product's safety and effectiveness.

In the area of medical devices, the act specifies that the FDA may keep out of the market products whose manufacturing processes are so deficient that they could present a serious health hazard. The law also gives the agency authority to take appropriate action if the technology of a device suggests that it is likely to be used for a potentially harmful unlabeled use.

Prescription Drug User Fee Act
The FDAMA required all of these specifications, in addition many of these provisions were required to completed in a specific time period. These are specified in the FDAMA Implementation Chart of Completed Items.

Establishment of a clinical trials registry
Exploration began with this 1997 act. The government established ClinicalTrials.gov as a result in 2000.

Controversies
The biggest complaint in regards to this act was the amount of time, money, and effort it would require. This act required the government to make good on a lot of its promises within the FDA.
On October 7, 1998, the Acting Commissioner of the Food and Drug Administration, Michael A. Friedman, M.D., said this in regards to the acts implementation:

Coming at this time of vigorous scientific growth, implementing FDAMA is one of the most demanding challenges faced by the Agency in its 92 year history. It has been a challenge, albeit one I believe we have substantially met, to promulgate the many regulations and guidances, and take the other steps, necessary to effectuate the changes set forth in the statute. We are thoroughly committed to meeting this challenge.

Critics questioned the necessity of the act, stating that the Federal Food, Drug, and Cosmetic Act was a substantial legislature on its own. In addition, many questioned whether the shortened time frame for the approval of prescription drugs would do more harm than good.

See also
Food and Drug Administration Amendments Act of 2007

References

External links

FDA page on the FDAMA 
 FDAMA Implementation Chart of Completed Items

Food and Drug Administration
Pharmaceuticals policy
United States federal health legislation
Acts of the 105th United States Congress